Betty Bourquin (in marriage also known as Betty Bourquin-Steffen) is a former Swiss female curler and curling coach.

Teams

Record as a coach of national teams

References

External links
 

Living people

Swiss female curlers
World curling champions
European curling champions
Swiss curling champions
Swiss curling coaches
Year of birth missing (living people)
20th-century Swiss women